The Burning Hell is a band fronted by songwriter Mathias Kom and multi-instrumentalist Ariel Sharratt, particularly known for their literate songwriting, DIY ethos, and dynamic live performances. Kom holds a PhD in ethnomusicology at Memorial University of Newfoundland, where he studied the political economy of DIY music.

History
The Burning Hell began in 2006 as the songwriting project of Mathias Kom. During the first few years of the band's existence, band membership fluctuated from tour to tour and album to album and the band's instrumentation was often determined by what instruments Kom's friends played. The regular touring and recording lineup from 2011 to 2016 was consistently Kom, Ariel Sharratt (clarinet), Darren Browne (guitar), Nick Ferrio (bass) and Jake Nicoll (drums). Since 2013 Kom and Sharratt have embarked on occasional duo tours and since 2017 the band has toured with a variety of lineups, always including Sharratt—who switches between drums, bass, and woodwinds—and frequently Browne and/or Nicoll.

Known for their live shows and hyper-literate lyrics, The Burning Hell have toured extensively in Europe, North America, and Australia. Kom's songs frequently take the form of fantastic narratives ("Bird Queen of Garbage Island", "The Stranger", "Barbarians", "Nonfiction", "Grave Situation Pt. 1"). Other subject matter has included the apocalypse ("When the World Ends", "Supermoon", "Birdwatching"); failure and amateurism ("Give Up", "Amateur Rappers", "Professional Rappers"); and nostalgia and pop music ("Nostalgia", "Men Without Hats", "Grown-Ups").

In 2011, Kom and Sharratt co-founded the Lawnya Vawnya Music Festival in St. John's, Newfoundland.

In 2012 the band played 10 shows between the Netherlands and Slovenia in twenty-four hours. The band claims the unofficial world record for playing the most shows in different countries in 24 hours.

In 2014, the tribute album My Name Is Mathias, featuring Canadian and international musicians performing the band's songs, was released, featuring covers by artists such as John K. Samson, Mike O'Neill, Mike Feuerstack, Dan Mangan, Dave Bidini, Great Lake Swimmers and Susie Asado. Kom donates all proceeds from the sale of this album to the Kingston Humane Society.

The Burning Hell released the albums Public Library in 2016, Revival Beach in 2017 and Never Work in 2020. A new album titled Garbage Island was self-recorded and produced by Kom, Sharratt, and Nicoll during the pandemic, and was released in 2022 on You've Changed Records and BB*Island.

Discography

Albums
 Tick Tock (2006), Weewerk
 Happy Birthday (2008), Weewerk
 Baby (2009), Weewerk
 This Charmed Life (2010), Weewerk
 Flux Capacitor (2011), Weewerk
 People (2013), BB*Island
 Public Library (2016), BB*Island
 Revival Beach (2017), BB*Island
 Garbage Island (2022), BB*Island, You've Changed Records

EPs
 The Burning Hell and Construction & Destruction (2009) split 7-inch, Independent
 Saddle Sores (2011), Ticker Records
 Hear Some Evil (2011) split 7-inch with Wax Mannequin, Label Fantastic!
 Duets mit Germans (2011), Ticker Records
 Old, New, Borrowed, Blue (2013) 10-inch, Headless Owl Records
 Birdwatching On Garbage Island (2019), Independent

Singles
 "Grave Situation Part One" (2008) split 7-inch with Jenny Omnichord
 "Amateur Rappers" / "Professional Rappers" (2014) 7-inch
 "Pop Goes The World" / "Men Without Hats" (2016)
 "9 To 5" / "Game Of Pricks" (2019)
 "No Peace" (2019) split 7-inch with Boo Hoo
 "I Want to Drink in a Bar" (2020) split 7-inch with B.A. Johnston
 "Bird Queen of Garbage Island" / "Birdhouse in Your Soul" (2021) 7-inch with accompanying comic book
 "Nigel the Gannet"/ "Lark Descending" (2022)

Compilations
 My Name Is Mathias (2014), Headless Owl Records
 Live Animals (2015), Independent

Folk Duo Albums by Mathias Kom & Ariel Sharratt
 Don't Believe the Hyperreal  (2015), BB*Island
 Never Work (2020), BB*Island

See also

Music of Canada
Canadian rock
List of bands from Canada

References

External links
 The Burning Hell official website
 BB*Island Record label (for Europe)
 Headless Owl Records Record label (for Canada)
 weewerk Record label (until 2001)

Musical groups established in 2007
Canadian indie rock groups
Canadian folk rock groups
Canadian indie folk groups